The Royal Oak is a Grade II listed public house at 73 Columbia Road, Bethnal Green, London, E2.

It was built in 1923 for Truman's Brewery, and probably designed by their in-house architect A. E. Sewell.

It was Grade II listed in 2015 by Historic England.

The pub has appeared in the TV series Goodnight Sweetheart, and the 1998 film Lock, Stock and Two Smoking Barrels.

In July 2020, the previously independently ran pub was bought by the chain Young's.

References

Pubs in the London Borough of Tower Hamlets
Grade II listed buildings in the London Borough of Tower Hamlets
Grade II listed pubs in London
A. E. Sewell buildings
Bethnal Green